Denys Dmytrovych Balan (born 18 August 1993) is a Ukrainian professional footballer who plays as a defender for Veres Rivne.

Club career

Early years
Balan is a product of the DYuSSh-11 in his native city Odesa and Dynamo Kyiv academies.

He played for Dynamo Kyiv and Dnipro Dnipropetrovsk in the Ukrainian Premier League Reserves and then in the Ukrainian Second League and Ukrainian First League until July 2017, when he signed contract with Chornomorets Odesa.

In December 2022 he signed a one-and-a-half-year contract with Veres Rivne in the Ukrainian Premier League.

References

External links
 
 

1993 births
Living people
Footballers from Odesa
Ukrainian footballers
Ukraine youth international footballers
Association football defenders
FC Dynamo Kyiv players
FC Dnipro players
FC Dynamo-2 Kyiv players
FC Real Pharma Odesa players
FC Cherkashchyna players
FC Chornomorets Odesa players
FC Inhulets Petrove players
FC Kryvbas Kryvyi Rih players
FC Silon Táborsko players
FC ViOn Zlaté Moravce players
Ukrainian Premier League players
Ukrainian First League players
Ukrainian Second League players
Ukrainian expatriate footballers
Expatriate footballers in the Czech Republic
Ukrainian expatriate sportspeople in the Czech Republic
Expatriate footballers in Slovakia
Ukrainian expatriate sportspeople in Slovakia